Whitby Swing Bridge is a pedestrian and road bridge over the River Esk in Whitby, North Yorkshire, England.

History

The River Esk has been crossed by bridges at this location for centuries. A grant made by King Edward III in 1351 allowed the collection of tolls for the maintenance of a bridge. By the mid 1550s the tolls averaged around £6 per annum (equivalent to £ as of ).

In 1629 an agreement was made by the justices in the North Riding to replace a wooden bridge with one which included moving parts. This was later replaced by a drawbridge and the first swing bridge was opened in 1833, designed by Francis Pickernell.

Current bridge

By the early 20th century the limited  clearance of the 1835 bridge was restricting the size of vessels which could be built up-stream of the bridge. A replacement swing bridge was commissioned by Whitby Urban District Council. It was designed by J Mitchell Moncrieff, later President of the Institution of Structural Engineers. It was opened in July 1909 by Mabel Theresa Duncombe, the daughter of the Viscount of Helmsley and the wife of local MP, Sir Gervase Beckett. The bridge consists of two leaves moved independently by electric motors.

The bridge originally carried the A171 road. To avoid congestion in the town centre, the road was diverted to a high level bridge over the Esk Valley built in 1980.

The bridge is not wide enough for vehicles to pass, so vehicular access to the bridge is controlled by traffic lights. The bridge is opened to shipping either side of high tide, but is quickly closed again to allow for traffic movement.

Until 2011 the bridge had a weight limit of 17 tons. This was reduced to 7.5 tons in 2011 by North Yorkshire County Council.

The bridge was featured in Episode 3 of the first season of the Amazon Prime series The Grand Tour during the "Celebrity Brain Crash" segment. Actor Simon Pegg walked across the bridge while it was opening, during which he was attacked by seagulls, resulting in him falling off and "drowning" in Whitby Harbour. The bridge was also visible in the background throughout the studio segments.

References

Bridges in North Yorkshire
Bridges completed in 1909
Swing bridges in England
Former toll bridges in England
1909 establishments in England